The 2020 All-Ireland Senior Club Hurling Championship final was a hurling match which was played at Croke Park on 19 January 2020 to determine the winners of the 2019-20 All-Ireland Senior Club Hurling Championship, the 50th season of the All-Ireland Senior Club Hurling Championship, a tournament organised by the Gaelic Athletic Association for the champion clubs of the four provinces of Ireland. The final was contested by Ballyhale Shamrocks of Kilkenny and Borris-Ileigh of Tipperary.	
	
The All-Ireland final between Ballyhale Shamrocks and Borris-Ileigh was the first ever championship meeting between the two teams. Ballyhale Shamrocks were hoping to win their 8th All-Ireland Club Championship, while Borris-Ileigh were bidding to win their second title after previously winning in 1987.

Ballyhale Shamrocks, captained by Michael Fennelly and coached by Henry Shefflin retained the title after defeating Borris-Ileigh by 0-18 to 0-15 to retain the title.

Match

Details

References

2020 in hurling
2020